Talal Abu-Ghazaleh (born April 22, 1938) is the chairman and founder of the international Jordan-based organisation, the Talal Abu-Ghazaleh Organization (TAG-Org). Dubbed as the godfather of Arab accounting, Abu-Ghazaleh has also been credited for promoting the significance of Intellectual Property in the Arab World.

Biography 
Born on April 22, 1938 in Jaffa, Palestine, eventually the 1948 war caused Abu-Ghazaleh to face exile to the Lebanese village of Ghaziyeh.

While still an undergraduate at the American University of Beirut, he was a teacher and translator.

In 1969, upon hearing a speech on intellectual property (IP) at a Time-Warner conference in San Francisco, USA, Abu-Ghazaleh decided to launch a career in the fields of Intellectual property rights (IPRs) and accounting.

In 1972, two firms - Talal Abu-Ghazaleh Company (TAGCO) and Abu-Ghazaleh Intellectual Property (AGIP) - were set up, specializing in the fields of accounting and IP respectively. Since then, Abu-Ghazaleh founded a total of 140 professional service firms specialized in various sector fields such as management, consulting, legal services, IT and much more.

Over the years, Abu-Ghazaleh managed to establish close partnerships with global organizations such as the UN and the WTO.

On April 4, 2007, UN Secretary General Ban Ki Moon appointed Abu-Ghazaleh, as deputy chairman of the UN Global Compact during its second meeting held at the UN headquarters in New York.

On October 24, 2007, Abu-Ghazaleh was inducted to the IP Hall of Fame in Chicago, USA, to become the first expert from outside the G8 countries to join the world's most prominent figures in IP.

On June 17, 2009, UN appoints Abu-Ghazaleh Chair of UN Global Alliance for ICT and Development. After receiving a letter from the Under-Secretary General of the United Nations Department of Economic and Social Affairs (UNDESA) HE Sha Zukang inviting him to lead the Alliance, composed of representatives from public, private and civil society sectors as well as international organizations.

On November 25, 2010, HE Senator Talal Abu-Ghazaleh, chairman and CEO of Talal Abu-Ghazaleh Organization (TAG-Org) was appointed a member of the Upper House according to a Royal Decree by His Majesty King Abdullah II .

Selected honors
 Decoration of Creativity in Innovation and Digital Transformation from Regional Donor Organizations, Bahrain (2016).
 Decoration of Independence of the First Order by His Majesty King Abdullah II bin Al-Hussein, Raghadan Palace, The Hashemite Kingdom of Jordan (2016).
 Senator, Jordanian Upper House, The Hashemite Kingdom of Jordan (2016).
 The Worldwide Alumni Association of AUB Distinguished Alumnus Award for 2016, from the American University of Beirut (2016).
ֺ Honorary Award for recognition and acknowledgment of the strong partnership with the United Nations Development Programme, Jordan (2016).
 Honorary Award for Enhancing the Sino-Arab Relations from HE Mr. Xi Jinping, President of the People’s Republic of China, Egypt (2016).
 Abu-Ghazaleh Social Responsibility Awards launched by CSR Regional Network for his efforts in social initiatives, Kingdom of Bahrain (2014).
 Visionary Leader Award from the Asian Education Leadership Awards, the UAE (2013)
 Member of the WTO Panel on Defining the Future of Trade, Geneva, 2012.
 The Arab Award for Media Creativity from the Arab Media Forum, Kuwait-2012.
 Member of the Upper House, Amman, Jordan, (2010-2011).
 Man of the Year Award from Palestine International Institute, Amman, 2012.
 Award of “Arab ICT Personality” of the Year 2010 from Union of Arab ICT Associations, Kingdom of Bahrain (2010).
 Honorary Award, The Arab Federation for the Protection of Intellectual Property Rights (AFPIPR), Jordan, 2009.
 The International Lifetime Achievement Award, Dubai, UAE, 2008.
 IP Hall of Fame Inductee, IP Hall of Fame Academy, Chicago, USA, 2007.
 Aljazeera Award for Lifetime Achievement, Qatar (2004).
 Honorary Ph.D. in Management and Economics, Jerash University, Jordan  (2016).
 Honorary Ph.D. in Business Administration, Mutah University, Jordan (2015).
 Honorary Ph.D. in Human Arts, Bethlehem University, Palestine (2014).
 Honorary Doctor of Humane Letters, Canisius College, New York, USA, 1988.
 Bachelor of Science in Business Administration, The American University of Beirut, Lebanon (1960).
 Decoration of the Republic of Tunisia, 1985.
 Chevalier de la Légion d'honneur, France, 1985.
 Coat of Arms of the Kuwaiti Association of Accountants and Auditors, 1983.
 Gold Mercury International Award, Bahrain, 1978.
 Decoration of Independence of the Hashemite Kingdom of Jordan, Jordan 1967.

Selected chairmanships 
 Chair of the Honorary Council of the Consortium for Sustainable Urbanization, USA, (2015)
 Co-chair of the UN Global Network on Promoting Digital Technologies for Sustainable Urbanization, USA, (2015).
 Chair of the CEO4Green, the Hashemite Kingdom of Jordan (2015).
 Honorary Chair of the Palestinian Association of Certified Public Accountants, Palestine (2015).
 Chair of the Arab Coalition of Services Industry, Lebanon (2015).
 Jordanian National Orchestra Association – JOrchestra	(2014).
 Aֺrab Economic Charter Task Force, The Hashemite Kingdom of Jordan (2013).
 Cֺhinese Arab Economic and Cultural Forum, The Hashemite Kingdom of Jordan (2013).
 Dֺrama Critic Forum, The Hashemite Kingdom of Jordan (2013).
 Chairman, Arab Coalition of Services, Doha, 2012.
 Chair of the Talal Abu-Ghazaleh University College of Business (TAG-UCB), Kingdom of Bahrain (2012). 
 Chair of the Talal Abu-Ghazaleh International University (TAGI-UNI), Lebanon (2012).
 Chair of the Jordanian Economic Observatory, The Hashemite Kingdom of Jordan, (2012).
 Chair of the Research Centre and Strategic Action, Switzerland, (2012).
 Chair of the Arab Baltic Foundation for Business and Education, The Hashemite Kingdom of Jordan (2012–present).
 Chair of the All for Palestine Initiative, France (2011–present).
 Chair of the Supreme Advisory Committee, International Cooperation Organization, Turkey (2012–Present).
 Chair of the Economic Policy Development Forum (EPDF), The Hashemite Kingdom of Jordan (2011–present)
 Chair of the Arab States Research and Education Network (ASREN), Germany (2010–present).
 Chair, Global Alliance for ICT and Development (GAID), New York – USA (2009-2010).
 Chairman, The Afro-Asian Knowledge Society Council- Egypt (2009).
 Chair of the Arab World of Internet Institute, USA (2008).
 Chairman, Encyclopedia of Excellence and Civilization Committee, Riyadh – KSA (2008).
 Chairman Board of Directors, UN Global Compact, New York – USA (2006–2008).
 Chair of the Arab Organization for Quality Assurance in Education (AROQA), Belgium (2007–present)
 Chair of the Universal Charter of the United Nations, USA (2007-2008).
 Chair of the Talal Abu-Ghazaleh Graduate School of Business (TAG-SB), The Hashemite Kingdom of Jordan (2006–present)
 Chair of the United Nations for Information and Communication Technology and Development, New York (2006-2010).
 Chair of Evian Group Governing Body, Geneva – Switzerland (2006–2009).
 Chair, Evian Group-Arab Region (EGAR) (2006–2009).
 Vice-Chair, ֺ the United Nations for Information and Communication Technology, New York – USA (2006).
 Chairman, Business Action to Support the Information Society (BASIS), International Chamber of Commerce (ICC), Paris - France (2006–2008).
 Chair of the International Chamber of Commerce, France (2005–Present)
 Chairman, Board of Trustees, Perspective Europe, Paris – France (2005–2007).
 President, Arab Intellectual Property Meditation Society (AIPMAS), Amman-Jordan (2003–present).
 Chairman, Advisory Committee on Internet Governance, United Nations Information and Communication Technologies Task Force (UN ICT TF), New York – USA (2003–2004).
 Chairman, The International Chamber of Commerce Task Force (ICC TF) on Internet Governance, Paris – France(2003–2004).
 Chair, Commission on E-Business, Information Technologies and Telecoms, International Chamber of Commerce (ICC), Paris – France (2001–2008).
 Chair of the  United Nations Information and Communication Technologies Task Force (UN ICT TF), New York – USA (2004–2006).
 Chairman, The Arab Regional Network of the United Nations Information and Communication Technologies Task Force (UN ICT TF), New York – USA (2001–2004).
 Chairman, The Working Group on Human Resources and Capacity Building (HRCB) of the United Nations Information and Communications Technologies, (UN ICT TF), New York – USA (2001–2002).
 First chairman of the Arab Internet Names Consortium (AINC), Amman- Jordan, (2001).
 President, Licensing Executives Society-Arab Countries (LES-AC), Amman-Jordan (1998–present).
 Chairman, U.N. Intergovernmental Working Group of Experts on International Standards of Accounting and Reporting (ISAR), New York – USA (1995–1996).
 Chairman, United Nations Committee of Experts on Professional Qualifications Standards, Geneva (1995–1998).
 Chair of the Middle East Council, Center for Strategic and International Studies, USA (1995-1997).
 Chair of the United Nations for the Development of Accounting Education, USA (1995).
 Chairman of the Committee for the Newly Industrialized and Developing Countries Affairs, the International Accounting Standards Committee (IASC) (1989–1992).
 President, Arab Knowledge and Management Society (AKMS), New York – USA (1989–present).
 Chair of the Affairs of the Modern Industrialized Nations and Developing Countries, the International Accounting Standards Committee (1989-1992).
 President, Arab Society for Intellectual Property (ASIP), Munich (1987–present); in consultative status to the World Intellectual Property Organization, (WIPO).
 Chair of the International, Arab Society of Certified Accountants (IASCA), London (1985–present); in consultative status with the United Nations Economic and Social Council, (ECOSOC).

Selected board memberships 
 Member of the Advisory Board of INSEAD Global Talent Competitiveness Index (GTCI), France (2017).
 Member of United Nations Social Impact Fund High Level Advisory Board (UNSIF-HLAB), (2017).
 Honorary membership from the Kuwaiti Association of Accountants and Auditors, Kuwait (2017).
 Special Ambassador, the World Tourism Organization (UNWTO), Madrid, Spain (2017).
 Member of the founding committee of the Council of Islamic Donor Institutions, Qatar (2016).
 Member of the Advisory Board of the Global Talent Competitiveness Index (GTCI), France (2014).
 Member of the Advisory Board of Hamdan Bin Mohammed Smart University, the United Arab Emirates (2014)
 Member of Bretton Woods Committee, the United States (2014).
 Global Social Responsibility Ambassador of  CSR Regional Network, Kingdom of Bahrain (2014).
 A Royal Commission to enhance integrity system, the Hashemite Kingdom of Jordan (since 2013). 	
 Council on Arab Relations with Latin America and the Caribbean (CARLAC), the UAE (2013).
 World Trade Organization (WTO) Panel on Defining the Future of Trade, Switzerland (since 2012).	
 Festival of Thinkers, the UAE (since 2011).
 International Advisory Board, University of Bahrain, Kingdom of Bahrain (2010-2011).
 International Advisory, E-City for King Hamad Ibn Isa Al Khalifa, Kingdom of Bahrain (2009). 
 Board of Directors, UN Global Compact, New York, USA (2006–2008).
 Advisory Board, Evian Group, Geneva, Switzerland (2005–2009).
 Honorary Board Membership, Afro-Asian Peoples’ Solidarity Organization  (2008).
 Executive Board, International Chamber of Commerce (ICC), Paris- France (2006–2009).
 Board of Trustees, Arab Anti Corruption Organization (2007–Present).
 International Chamber of Commerce (ICC), France (2007).
 Board of Directors, King Hussein Foundation, Washington, USA (2005–Present).
 The International Consultative Board, the World Coalition, New York, USA (2005).
 Board of Directors, World Links Arab Countries Advisory Council, (2004–2005).
 Public Sector Consultative Group, International Federation of Accountants (IFAC), New York-USA (2003–2006).
 Board of Trustees, King Hussein Cancer Center (KHCC), Amman, Jordan (2003–2006).
 Board of Trustees, National Music Conservatory (NMC), Amman, Jordan (2003–2005).
 Board of Directors, World Links Worldwide, Washington, USA (2003–2004).
 Knowledge Economy Community, Development Gateway, World Bank, Washington, USA (2002–2005).
 Advisory Board, Industry Advisory Commission, the World Intellectual Property Organization (WIPO), Geneva, Switzerland (1999–2000).
 Board of Advisors, Middle East Council of the Center for Strategic & International Studies (CSIS), Washington, USA (1995–1997).
 Member of the Board, International Federation of Accountants Council (IFAC), New York, USA (1992).
 Member of the Board, International Accounting Standards Committee (IASC), London, United Kingdom, (1988–1990).
 Member of the Arab Thought Forum (1988–present).
 Member of the Board, International Auditing Practices Committee (IAPC) of IFAC, New York, USA (1987–1990).
 Board of Governors, Keck Center for International Strategic Studies, Claremont, California, USA (1985–1988).
 Board of Trustees, American University of Beirut, Beirut, Lebanon (1980–1982).

Music patronages 
 Patron, Palais Garnier, France (2016).
 Patron, Jordanian National Orchestra Association (JOrchestra) musical concerts, The Hashemite Kingdom of Jordan (2014–Present).
 Patron, The Second Modernity: The Artistic Collaboration of Fairuz and Ziad Rahbani Conference, Anis Makdisi Program in Literature, American University in Beirut (AUB), Lebanon (2006).
 Patron, Walid Gholmieh Symphonies (2006).
 Patron, L’Association pour le Rayonnement de l’Opéra National de Paris (AROP) (2004–present).
 Patron, Lebanese National Symphony Orchestra (LNSO) (2003–present).
 Board of Trustees and Chair, National Music Conservatory (NMC), Amman, Jordan (2003–2005).
 Private Concert by Ramzy Yassa & Ghada Ghanem Concert, Cambridge, UK (2004).
 Patron, l'Opéra de Paris, France (2001–present).
 Private concert by the Mozarteum Orchestra of Salzburg, Salzburg, Austria (2000).
 28th General Assembly for the International Music Council, Petra, (Jordan) (September 1999).
 TAGO Golden Jubilee concert, London, UK (July 1997).
 Private concert by Ramzi Yassa, Seattle, USA (1994).
 Patron, Freunde der Salzburger Festspâele, Salzburg, Austria (1976).

Initiatives and publications
 In Capacity Building :
  Designed and produced TAGI TOP, Top of the line Laptop capability with Netbook portability.
  Talal Abu-Ghazaleh Knowledge Society is one of the leading initiatives by HE Senator Talal Abu-Ghazaleh which empowers the Arab youth as part of TAG-Org’s corporate responsibility.
 Talal Abu-Ghazaleh Knowledge Award: grants scholarships to distinctive Palestinians to study at TAGSB.
 Talal Abu-Ghazaleh Grant presented to West Bank and Gaza citizens to attain Certified Arab Professional Accountant qualifications.
 Grant to first ranked Arabic university graduates in accounting to attain the Certified Arab Professional Accountant qualification.
 Launch of the Adel Al-Sa’di Award for Excellence for the first ranked student in the Arab Certified Accountants Society.
 Electronic Arabic Encyclopedia (TAGEPEDIA).
 The Talal Abu-Ghazaleh Center for Business Research at Canisius College.
 Short story contest award “The Dreaded Echo” conducted by the Top Council for Care of the Arts, Literature and Social Sciences for the students of higher education institutions in the Arab countries.
 Dictionaries:
 Talal Abu-Ghazaleh ICT Dictionary 2nd edition (2013).
 Talal Abu-Ghazaleh IP Dictionary 2nd edition (2013).
 Talal Abu-Ghazaleh Dictionary of Patents (2012).
 Talal Abu-Ghazaleh Legal Dictionary (2012).
 Talal Abu-Ghazaleh Collocations Dictionary (2012).
Abu-Ghazaleh ICT Directory (2008).
The Abu-Ghazaleh Accountancy & Business Dictionary (2001).
The Abu-Ghazaleh IP Dictionary (2000).
The Abu-Ghazaleh English-Arabic Dictionary of Accounting (1978).

References

Sources
Developmentgateway.org
Perspective-Europe.Eu
Chamber.Org.hk
PMU University 

1938 births
Living people
Palestinian businesspeople
Jordanian businesspeople
Jordanian people of Palestinian descent
American University of Beirut alumni